Steven Gan (born c. 1963) is a Malaysian journalist known for co-founding and editing the political news website Malaysiakini (English: "Malaysia Today"), Malaysia's "first and only" independent news source. In 2000, he was awarded the International Press Freedom Award of the Committee to Protect Journalists (CPJ).

Work in print journalism
Gan received a degree in political economy from an Australian university in 1989. He began his journalistic career in print, as a freelancer for a Hong Kong-based newspaper. In 1991, he covered the Gulf War from Baghdad. In 1994, he returned to Malaysia, where he became a reporter for the new Malaysian daily The Sun. There he struggled against both government regulation and the self-censorship of The Sun'''s editors.

In 1995, he led a team of reporters that discovered that 59 inmates, primarily Bangladeshis, had died in the Semenyih immigration detention camp of the preventable diseases typhoid and beriberi. When Gan's editors refused to publish the story for fear of government reprisal, Gan passed the information to the immigrant rights organisation Tenaganita. Tenaganita publicised the reporters' findings, and its director, Irene Fernandez, was subsequently threatened with imprisonment for "publishing false news". Fernandez's trials and appeals from the case would last thirteen years, ending in her 2008 acquittal by the Kuala Lumpur Criminal High Court.

In 1996, Gan was arrested, along with four other reporters, at the 1996 Asia Pacific Conference on East Timor. During the five days he spent in jail, he was named a prisoner of conscience by Amnesty International. After his release, he wrote a column protesting his arrest and treatment, but his editors refused to publish it. Gan resigned in protest, going on to write editorials for the English-language Thai daily The Nation.

Malaysiakini
Though Malaysian law had provided for strict government controls on print media since 1984, the Malaysia Multimedia Super Corridor, an initiative to encourage technological development in Malaysia, was launched in 1995. A founding principle of the project was that government censorship of the Internet would not be permitted. Seeing a loophole, Gan and colleague Premesh Chandran decided to found an online news resource that would be free of the controls placed on print media.

The pair founded Malaysiakini.com in November 1999, with a staff of four other journalists and a starting budget of $100,000. Gan served as its editor-in-chief. For its first story, Malaysiakini posted a report on 20 November criticising the practices of Sin Chew Daily, Malaysia's largest-circulation Chinese-language newspaper. Sin Chew Daily had doctored a photograph of Malaysia's ruling party to remove Anwar Ibrahim, who had recently been imprisoned for corruption. According to BBC News, the Malaysiakini report led to "worldwide infamy" for  Sin Chew Daily, and the newspaper later issued a public apology. In April 2001, Malaysiakini made news again when it discovered and reported the secret detention of 10 political activists.

Within a year, the site had nearly 100,000 visitors a day, making it one of the most popular news sites in Malaysia; it had also expanded to a full-time staff of twelve. In January 2012, Alexa Internet ranked it as the 14th most popular website in the country. However, attracting advertising was often a challenge for the website, which Gan blamed on collusion between Malaysian politicians and businesspeople.

Government responses to Malaysiakini
Prime Minister Mahathir Mohamad described the Malaysiakini staff as "traitors" and suggested that the paper was funded by financier George Soros, whose currency speculation the Prime Minister blamed for the 1997 Asian financial crisis that had devastated Malaysia's economy.

In a 2002 article in Nieman Reports, Gan stated that Malaysiakini was repeatedly hacked during the first years of its existence. Citing a government statement to launch "missiles" at opposition websites, Gan speculated that the Malaysian government was behind the cyberattacks. The website suffered further cyber-attacks in April and July 2011, coinciding with an election in Sarawak and the pro-electoral reform Bersih 2.0 rally; again Gan alleged that the government was responsible.

On 20 January 2003, police raided the Malaysiakini office and confiscated its servers and 15 newsroom computers, costing an estimated RM150,000 ($40,000 USD). The raid followed a call by the youth wing of the right-wing political party UMNO to investigate the site for sedition after it published a letter criticising the government's pro-Malay quotas in hiring and scholarships. The website was able to go back online ten hours after the raid.

Awards and recognition
Gan was awarded one of the 2000 CPJ International Press Freedom Awards, along with Željko Kopanja of Bosnia and Herzegovina, Modeste Mutinga of the Democratic Republic of Congo, and Mashallah Shamsolvaezin of Iran. The CPJ describes the award as "an annual recognition of courageous journalism".

In July 2001, Businessweek named Gan one of the "Stars of Asia" in the category "Opinion Shapers". Later that year, Malaysiakini'' won a Free Media Pioneer award from the International Press Institute.

References

External links
Malaysiakini website

Amnesty International prisoners of conscience held by Malaysia
Living people
Malaysian journalists
Date of birth missing (living people)
1960s births
Malaysian prisoners and detainees